Joan Bou Company (born 16 January 1997) is a Spanish cyclist, who currently rides for UCI ProTeam .

Major results
2019
 8th Overall Tour de Hokkaido
1st  Mountains classification
2021
 4th Overall Troféu Joaquim Agostinho
1st  Mountains classification
  Combativity award Stage 6 Vuelta a España
2022
 Vuelta a España
Held  after Stage 4
 Combativity award Stage 13

Grand Tour general classification results timeline

References

External links

1997 births
Living people
Spanish male cyclists
Sportspeople from Valencia
Cyclists from the Valencian Community